Bian (also Romanized as Bīān and Bayān) is a village in Gamasiyab Rural District, in the Central District of Nahavand County, Hamadan Province, Iran. At the 2006 census, its population was 1,479, in 413 families.

References 

Populated places in Nahavand County